"Lay Away" is a 1972 funk-rock single released by The Isley Brothers on their T-Neck imprint. Released as the first record off their Brother, Brother, Brother album, the song depicted the narrator's description of how his lover's love was so special that he wanted to have for keeps just in case (hence the lyrics going back to get (your love) on a rainy day/your love is safe in my lay-away). The song took the riff of Honey Cone's "Want Ads" especially in the bridges. The song was significant for showcasing brother Ernie on lead guitar for the first time on an Isley Brothers record. Written and produced by elder brothers O'Kelly, Rudolph and Ronald, the song charted at number fifty-four pop and number six R&B in the spring of 1972.

Credits
Lead vocals by Ronald Isley
Background vocals by O'Kelly Isley, Jr. and Rudolph Isley
Instrumentation by the Isley Brothers:
Ernie Isley: guitars
Chris Jasper: piano
Marvin Isley: bass guitar
Other instrumentation by assorted musicians

References

External links

1972 singles
The Isley Brothers songs
Songs written by Rudolph Isley
Songs written by O'Kelly Isley Jr.
Songs written by Ronald Isley
T-Neck Records singles